Wilson is an unincorporated community located in Comanche County, in the U.S. state of Texas.

History
Wilson was named for George Wilson, the community's first postmaster who operated the post office at his house in 1880. The community is home to the Madison Square Garden Rodeo stock and also served as the headquarters of the Lightning C ranch. Its population was 75 in 1904 and had several businesses. Wilson declined when the railroad bypassed the community. The post office closed in 1908 and people moved on. There was no population reported in 1980.

Geography
Wilson is located in southeastern Comanche County.

Education
Wilson had its own school in 1930 and joined the school in nearby Carlton in 1947. The building is now used as a community center and church. Today, the community is served by the Dublin Independent School District.

References

Unincorporated communities in Comanche County, Texas
Unincorporated communities in Texas